HD 35619 is a double star in the northern constellation of Auriga. It has an apparent magnitude of 8.572, which is too faint to be viewed with the naked eye.  The companion is 12th magnitude and 2 arc-seconds away.

References

External links
 ALS 8363
 CCDM J05276+3445
 Image HD 35619

Auriga (constellation)
035619
Double stars
O-type main-sequence stars
Durchmusterung objects
Emission-line stars